Caroline Quarlls (1826–1892) was the first enslaved person to travel through Wisconsin using the Underground Railroad. She reached Canada and freedom in 1842. Multiple abolitionists helped Caroline on her journey to Canada even as pursuers followed continuously. She married a freedman in Canada, becoming Caroline Quarlls Watkins.

Early life
Caroline Quarlls was born in St. Louis in 1826, enslaved by her paternal grandfather. Robert Pryor Quarlls (also Quarles), was her father and owner. Her mother had married a successful blacksmith who was born free. Quarll's mother and her sister were dead by the time she was sixteen, but Quarlls had been in contact with her stepfather who was very kind to her and talked with her about her plans to escape slavery.

A housemaid in St. Louis, Quarlls looked like her half-siblings, but was not granted the same freedom as they were. Upon her father's passing, she was acquired by her new mistress, Robert's sister and her aunt, Mrs. Charles R. Hall. Quarlls was occasionally whipped and punished. Noted as being quite intelligent, she was able to read but had never learned to write. She was brought up doing fine sewing, embroidery, and waiting upon her mistress.

Flight
When Quarlls was a teenager, her mistress became angry with her for looking at her reflection in a mirror and cut her hair off. Determined to escape such assaults, she managed to gain permission from her mistress to see a sick girl. On July 4, 1842, the 16-year-old threw a bundle of clothes out a window, retrieved them, and walked down to the ferry to begin her journey along the Underground Railroad. She had taken $100 from her former master, and purchased a ticket for a steamboat to Alton, Illinois. Of mixed race, she was able to pass as a white girl. She traveled by stagecoach through Illinois to Milwaukee. She was pursued by slave catchers for the $300 bounty placed on her. 

After staying around a week at the home of Robert Titball, a formerly enslaved barber, Titball told slavecatching-lawyers that Quarlls had been staying at her home. A Black boy who worked for him alerted Quarlls at Titball's bidding but did not take her to the place the barber suggested. Quarlls hid in a container in a boat as she was brought across the Milwaukee River by prominent attorney Asahel Finch. From Milwaukee, Quarlls was brought to Pewaukee, Wisconsin by Samuel Brown; the two traveled via an old rickety wagon. Brown transported Quarlls to the home of Lucinda and Samuel Daugherty in Lisbon, Waukesha County.  She met up with Lyman Goodnow, a conductor on the Underground Railroad.  At times she walked, and other times she hid under hay in a horse-drawn wagon. There were days of dusty trails and other times heavy rain. They traveled through stations on Wisconsin's Underground Railroad, including Prairieville (now Waukesha), Spring Prairie and Gardner's Prairie near Burlington and on to Illinois. The clerk of the steamboat that Quarlls took to Alton was liable to pay her master $800 if Quarlls was not found. Goodnow and Quarlls learned that the clerk was traveling through Illinois looking for her, too. At a schoolhouse at Beebe's Grove, Quarlls asked about the "liberty pole" near where she was standing. She learned that it was common in villages in the North as a commemoration of the birth of liberty in the United States. Quarlls asked, "How can it commemorate liberty in a country where there is no liberty; where more than one-fifth of the inhabitants are in bondage?"

They traveled through Illinois, Indiana, and Michigan, while continuing to be pursued by slave hunters and lawyers. Quarlls and Goodnow stopped at the house of Guy Beckley in Ann Arbor, the last stop before Detroit where they crossed the Detroit River for Canada. Goodnow guided her  into Canada. Abolitionists have given the two a purse of travel necessities to help the two cross the border. 
Her journey lasted five weeks throughout multiple states into Canada.

Life in Canada
After arriving in Canada, Caroline attended school during her first year in Canada. After three years, she married an older widower, Allen Watkins, himself a freed slave. From Virginia and Kentucky, he had children with his first wife. He was a cook and Quarlls and her husband made a good living for their family through hard work. She had learned that she had been left property, which she would have received if she had remained in St. Louis until she became of age. The Watkins raised three boys and three girls, who all had good educations.

She corresponded with Goodnow, stating,

Caroline Quarlls Watkins died in Sandwich in March 1888 or 1892.

References

Further reading
 
 

1824 births
1892 deaths
American emigrants to pre-Confederation Ontario
19th-century American slaves
Canadian people of African-American descent
People from St. Louis